Marc Veira (born 17 March 1980), better known by his stage name Flowdan, is an English grime MC and record producer from Bow and Poplar, East London. A founding member of Roll Deep, he was responsible for naming the group and remained a member until its hiatus. In 2015, he founded his own record label, SpentShell, which has since signed YGG and GHSTLY XXVII to its roster.

Career
A long-standing member of Roll Deep, Flowdan appears on all five of their albums. A good friend of Wiley, the crew's de facto leader, he came from a drum and bass and jungle background and was part of the first wave of grime MCs. His first solo album, Original Dan, was released in 2009 and featured a range of guest artists, including Frisco, Wiley, Killa P and Riko. An EP, Serious Business, followed in 2014, and his second full-length album Disaster Piece was released in 2016, to more positive reviews than his debut.

Flowdan is also known for his frequent collaboration with dub and dancehall producer The Bug, and has appeared on at least seven of his songs.

In 2018, Flowdan forayed further into record production. He produced tracks for PK's Bad Ombré EP and GHSTLY XXVII's Guerrilla Tactics EP, the first two releases on his new label and agency, SpentShell. He also contributed preset sounds and samples as well as entire demo tracks to Native Instruments' Maschine expansion pack 'London Grit'. In June 2018, he released the four-track One Shell Fits All EP, featuring vocals from D Double E, Nasty Jack, GHSTLY XXVII and Meridian Dan, and production from Masro, Teddy Music, Filthy Gears and Jammz.

Style
Flowdan is known for his deep voice and use of patois lyrics. Although rooted in grime, he performs over various different styles, from the drum and bass of his early days, to the dubstep of his numerous features with The Bug.

Discography

Solo
Albums
2009: Original Dan
2016: Disaster Piece
2019: Full Metal Jacket
2020: The Red Pill 

EPs
2014: Serious Business
2018: One Shell Fits All

Singles
2002: "Big Mic Man"
2003: "Skydiver"
2016: "Horror Show Style"
2016: "Grime"
2017: "Original Raggamuffin" (featuring Wiley)
2019: "Welcome to London"

As featured artist
2001: "Terrible" (Roll Deep Entourage featuring Wiley, Breeze, Bubbles and Flowdan)
2001: "Wickedest Ting" (Geeneus and Wiley featuring Flowdan and Breeze)
2001: "1, 2, 3, 4..." (Pay As U Go Cartel)
2001: "Dem No Ready" (Pay As U Go Cartel)
2003: "Time Wasters" (Remix) (Musketeers featuring Maxwell D and Flowdan)
2007: "Skeng" (The Bug featuring Killa P and Flowdan)
2007: "Jah War" (The Bug featuring Flowdan)
2007: "Poison Dart" (The Bug featuring Warrior Queen and Flowdan)
2009: "Bullet A' Go Fly" (DVA featuring Badness, Riko, Killa P and Flowdan)
2012: "Say Nothin'" (Jubei featuring Flowdan)
2017: "Round Here" (Lethal Bizzle featuring Giggs and Flowdan)
2017: "Round Here - Remix" (Lethal Bizzle featuring Abra Cadabra, Ghetts, Frisco and Flowdan)
2018: "Inventor" (Rockwell featuring Flowdan)
2019: "Start Up" (Boylan featuring Flowdan)
2019 "London In The Rain" (Meridian Dan featuring Flowdan)
2021: "Trenches" (Duke & Jones featuring Flowdan)
2022: "Gassed Up" (Zeds Dead and Subtronics featuring Flowdan)
2023: "Rumble" (Skrillex and Fred Again and Flowdan)
2023: "Hydrate" (Skrillex with Flowdan, Beam and Peekaboo)

With Roll Deep

Albums
2005: In at the Deep End
2007: Rules and Regulations
2008: Return of the Big Money Sound
2010: Winner Stays On
2012: X

References

External links
Flowdan on Last fm
Flowdan on Discogs
Interview With Ransom Note

1980 births
Living people
Black British male rappers
English record producers
Grime music artists
People from Bow, London
People from Poplar, London
Rappers from London